George Pierce Baker III serves as the Herman C. Krannert Professor of Business Administration at Harvard Business School.

He coauthored with George David Smith The New Financial Capitalists: Kohlberg Kravis Roberts and the Creation of Corporate Value.

He graduated from Harvard College and Harvard Business School.

Sources

Harvard Business School faculty
Living people
Year of birth missing (living people)
Place of birth missing (living people)
Harvard College alumni
Harvard Business School alumni